Rushy Meadows is an  biological Site of Special Scientific Interest on the western outskirts of Kidlington in Oxfordshire.

This site consists of unimproved alluvial grasslands on the bank of the Oxford Canal. The species-rich sward is dominated by hard rush, and other plants include  water avens, which is very uncommon in the Thames Basin, pepper saxifrage, devil's bit scabious, early marsh orchid and distant sedge.

The site is private land with no public access.

References

 
Sites of Special Scientific Interest in Oxfordshire